Menko or Menco (1213/4 – 1276) was a priest and chronicler. Over the next five years he served as vestiarius, cellarer and schoolmaster before being elected Bloemhof's third abbot in 1243. During his abbacy, he wrote a continuation of the Latin house chronicle, Cronica Floridi Horti, begun by the first abbot, Emo. He has an important account of the Frisian crusaders on the Eighth Crusade in 1269–1270. His continuation runs to 1273. He died in 1276. His autograph manuscript survives, as does a later copy of his chronicle with an anonymous continuation down to 1296.

Notes

Bibliography

1210s births
1276 deaths
Medieval West Frisians
Chroniclers
Christian abbots
People from Groningen (province)
Premonstratensians